The 2003 South Tyneside Metropolitan Borough Council election took place on 1 May 2003 to elect members of South Tyneside Metropolitan Borough Council in Tyne and Wear, England. One third of the council was up for election and the Labour Party kept overall control of the council.

After the election, the composition of the council was:
Labour 49
Liberal Democrat 5
Progressives 3
Independent 2
Conservative 1

Campaign
59 candidates stood in the election for the 20 seats that were being contested. Labour stood in all 20 seats, while the Conservatives had 14 candidates, Liberal Democrats 12, independents 7, Progressives 5 and the British National Party 1. As well as the postal voting that had been used in the 2002 election, South Tyneside was one of 4 councils which also trialed e-voting, enabling votes to be sent by phone, text message, e-mail and be placed in special electronic voting kiosks.

Labour were guaranteed to keep a majority on the council whatever the results, but both the Liberal Democrats and the Progressives hoped to make gains in the election, while the Conservatives aimed to gain a presence on the council. Hebburn Quay was seen as being a key ward as the sitting Liberal Democrat councillor Catherine Tolson stood down at the election, and Labour had only been 20 votes from winning in 1999. Labour defended their record in power including regeneration and improving care for the elderly, however they were attacked for increasing council tax bills and for the closure of leisure facilities.

Election result
At the count the results were delayed for over an hour after there was a problem with the electronic counting system. When the count was done, recounts were needed in both Cleadon and East Boldon and Whiteleas wards.

The results saw Labour keep a strong majority on the council despite losing 2 seats to independents in Hebburn South and Whiteleas wards. The Liberal Democrats managed to hold on to Hebburn Quay ward, but lost Cleadon and East Boldon to the Conservatives. The Conservative candidate in Cleadon and East Boldon, Donald Wood, won by 3 votes and thus became the first member of the party on the council since 1992. Overall turnout in the election was 46.11%.

Ward results

References

2003
2003 English local elections
21st century in Tyne and Wear